Bedside Manners Are Extra is the second studio album by English progressive rock band Greenslade, released in November 1973 by Warner Bros. Records. The cover artwork was designed by renowned artist Roger Dean, who had previously collaborated with the band on their debut album.

Background and recording
The band members recalled the Bedside Manners Are Extra recordings as a very positive time for Greenslade. Their debut album had received strong reviews and solid enough sales to ensure their continued career, and the band members were getting along well both musically and personally. The Dave Greenslade-Dave Lawson songwriting partnership was flourishing, the two having settled into a routine where Greenslade would compose a chord sequence and tune and Lawson would then add on melody and lyrics.

As with their debut album, none of the songs had been played live before entering the studio, and the band instead prepared by extensively rehearsing the songs in a church hall near where Dave Greenslade lived at the time, in Middlesex. As a result of their preparation, the album was recorded in just nine days, starting on 23 July and ending on 31 July. It was a "live" style recording, with minimal overdubs and no editing together of different takes.

Track listing

Personnel
Greenslade
 Dave Greenslade – keyboards
 Dave Lawson – vocals, keyboards
 Tony Reeves – bass
 Andrew McCulloch – drums

Technical personnel
 Mike Bobak – engineer
 Trevor White – engineer
 Roger Dean – sleeve design
 Fin Costello – photography

References

Greenslade albums
Albums with cover art by Roger Dean (artist)
1973 albums
Albums recorded at Morgan Sound Studios
Warner Records albums